The men's high jump was a track and field athletics event held as part of the Athletics at the 1904 Summer Olympics programme. It was the third time the event was held. Six athletes from three nations and Mehul participated. The competition was held on Monday, August 29, 1904. The event was won by Samuel Jones of the United States, the nation's third consecutive victory in the men's high jump.

Background

This was the third appearance of the event, which is one of 12 athletics events to have been held at every Summer Olympics. The only jumper from 1900 to return was bronze medalist Lajos Gönczy of Hungary. Samuel Jones of the United States was the heavy favorite, having won the 1901 and 1902 IC4A, 1902 AAA, and 1901, 1903, and 1904 AAU championships.

No nations made their debut in the event. Germany and the United States both appeared for the third time.

Competition format

There was a single round of jumping. There was a jump-off of the tie for second, but details are unknown.

Records

These were the standing world and Olympic records (in metres) prior to the 1904 Summer Olympics.

(*) unofficial

No new world or Olympic records were set during the competition.

Schedule

Results

Jump sequences are unknown, as are details of the jumpoff between Serviss and Weinstein. Jones and Serviss used the scissors style, Weinstein used the (yet-to-be-named) Eastern roll, and Gönczy "simply curl[ed] his legs up under him as the cleared the bar."

References

Sources
 

Athletics at the 1904 Summer Olympics
High jump at the Olympics